Delva is a surname. Notable people with the surname include:

 Anaïs Delva (born 1986), French singer and actress
 Melanie Delva, Canadian animator
 Norman Delva (born 1969), Guatemalan footballer

See also
 Delver, 2018 video game